Barbara K. Moore (born 27 July 1957) is a retired female athlete from New Zealand, who specialised in long-distance running during her career.

She competed for New Zealand in the 1990 Commonwealth Games, winning a bronze in the 10,000m race.

She is a recipient of the New Zealand 1990 Commemoration Medal.

References

Athletes at the Games by John Clark, page 87 (1998, Athletics New Zealand)   
Profile at NZOGC website

1957 births
Athletes (track and field) at the 1990 Commonwealth Games
Commonwealth Games bronze medallists for New Zealand
New Zealand female long-distance runners
Living people
Commonwealth Games medallists in athletics
Medallists at the 1990 Commonwealth Games